The Brazil men's national under-23 volleyball team represents Brazil in international men's volleyball competitions and friendly matches under  the age 23 and it is ruled by the Brazilian Volleyball Federation that is a member of South American volleyball body Confederación Sudamericana de Voleibol (CSV) and the international volleyball body government the Fédération Internationale de Volleyball (FIVB).

Results

U23 World Championship
 Champions   Runners up   Third place   Fourth place

U23 South America Championship
 Champions   Runners up   Third place   Fourth place

Team

Current squad

The following is the Brazilian roster in the 2015 FIVB Volleyball Men's U23 World Championship.

Head coach: Roberley Leonaldo

Former squads

U23 World Championship
2013 –  Gold medal
Alan Souza, Fernando Kreling, Otávio Pinto, Lucas Lóh, Thiago Veloso, Ricardo Lucarelli Souza (c), Felipe Quaresma, Ary Nóbrega, Matheus Cunda, Leandro Santos, Rafael Araújo, Ricardo Rego and Guilherme Kachel
2015 – 5th place
Alan Souza, Wagner Silva, Eder Kock, Rogério Filho, Leandro Santos, Carlos Eduardo Silva, Fernando Kreling, Henrique Batagim, João Ferreira, Flavio Gualberto, Thiago Veloso (c) and Douglas Souza
2017 – 4th place
Leonardo Nascimento, Felipe Roque, Rogério Filho, Fabio Rodrigues, Eduardo Sobrinho, Nicolas Santos, Rodrigo Leão, Douglas Souza, Gabriel Candido, Fernando Kreling (c), Romulo Silva, and Matheus Santos

See also
 Brazil men's national volleyball team
 Brazil men's national under-21 volleyball team
 Brazil men's national under-19 volleyball team
 Brazil women's national under-23 volleyball team
 Brazil women's national under-20 volleyball team
 Brazil women's national under-18 volleyball team

References

External links
 Official website 

National men's under-23 volleyball teams
Volleyball in Brazil
Volleyball